The Tasmanian Electoral Commission (TEC) in Tasmania, Australia, established in 2005, is an independent office which conducts parliamentary and local government elections in Tasmania. Elections for the House of Assembly take place every four years, and for the Legislative Council every year on a rotational basis.

The next election for the House of Assembly will be held by 28 June 2025. The next elections for the Legislative Council, for the divisions of Launceston, Murchison and Rumney, will be held in 2023. The next elections for local government councils will be held during September and October 2022.

See also

Elections in Australia

References

External links
 

Tasmania
Elections in Tasmania
Government agencies of Tasmania
2005 establishments in Australia